The 2017 Coppa Italia Final decided the winner of the 2016–17 Coppa Italia, the 70th season of Italy's main football cup. It was played on 17 May 2017 at the Stadio Olimpico in Rome between Juventus and Lazio.

Juventus won the match 2–0 with two first-half goals from Dani Alves and Leonardo Bonucci, winning their third consecutive Coppa Italia title and 12th title overall.

Road to the final
Note: In all results below, the score of the finalist is given first (H: home; A: away).

Match

Date change
The 2017 Coppa Italia Final was originally scheduled to be played on 2 June, however with the qualification of Juventus to the 2017 UEFA Champions League Final on 3 June, the date was changed to 17 May.

Summary
Dani Alves opened the scoring for Juventus after 12 minutes with a right foot volley from eight yards out after a cross from the left by Alex Sandro. Leonardo Bonucci got the second when he tapped in from close range after a corner from the left from Paulo Dybala was deflected into his path.

Details

References

Coppa Italia Finals
Coppa Italia Final
Coppa Italia Final 2017
Coppa Italia Final 2017
May 2017 sports events in Italy
Coppa Italia Final 2017
Coppa Italia Final 2017
Coppa Italia Final 2017